Krzysztof Wójcik  (born October 20, 1960 in Żagań, Poland) is a retired Polish volleyball player. He played as receiver and also as a libero at the end of his career. He played for many seasons as a basic player in AZS PWSZ Nysa sports club. He ended his career in 2005/06 season as player of Chemik Bydgoszcz.

After ending his career as a player he soon became coach of men volleyball.

Achievements
 Participant of FIVB World League (2001)
 Fifth place at 2001 Men's European Volleyball Championship
 Third place in Polish Volleyball League (2003)
 First place in Polish Volleyball League with Ivett Jastrzębie Borynia (2004)

Career

As a player 
 AZS PWSZ Nysa (1982/83–1995/96)
 Ivett Jastrzębie Borynia (2000/01)
 Ivett Jastrzębie Borynia (2001/02–2003/04)
 Chemik Bydgoszcz (2004/05–2005/06)

As a coach 
 Joker Piła (2007/08)
 Ósemka Siedlce (2008/09)
 Krispol Września (2009)

References
 Wójcik's profile 

1960 births
Living people
Polish men's volleyball players
People from Żagań
Sportspeople from Lubusz Voivodeship